Senator Marshall may refer to:

Members of the United States Senate
Humphrey Marshall (politician) (1760–1841), U.S. Senator from Kentucky from 1795 to 1801
Roger Marshall (politician) (born 1960), U.S. Senator from Kansas since 2021

United States state senate members
Alexander J. Marshall (1803–1882), Virginia State Senate
Bob Marshall (Kansas politician) (fl. 2000s–2010s), Kansas State Senate
Elaine Marshall (born 1945), North Carolina State Senate
Henry Marshall (Brooklyn) (1847–1938), New York State Senate
Henry Marshall (Louisiana politician) (1805–1864), Louisiana State Senate
James Keith Marshall (1817–1862), Virginia State Senate
James William Marshall (politician) (1844–1911), Virginia State Senate
L. L. Marshall (1888–1958), Ohio State Senate
Leroy T. Marshall (1883–1950), Ohio State Senate
N. Monroe Marshall (1854–1935), New York State Senate
Oliver S. Marshall (1850–1934), West Virginia State Senate
Robert I. Marshall (born 1946), Delaware State Senate
Thomas Frank Marshall (1854–1921), North Dakota State Senate
Thomas Marshall (Illinois politician) (1817–1873), Illinois State Senate
Thomas Marshall (Maine politician) (1826–1861), Maine State Senate